Safar Zai (also Romanized as Şafar Zā’ī; also known as Şafar Zahī) is a village in Qorqori Rural District, Qorqori District, Hirmand County, Sistan and Baluchestan Province, Iran. At the 2006 census, its population was 129, in 19 families.

References 

Populated places in Hirmand County